Leonie Nichols (born 19 March 1979) is an Australian synchronized swimmer who competed in the 2004 Summer Olympics.

References

1979 births
Living people
Australian synchronised swimmers
Olympic synchronised swimmers of Australia
Synchronized swimmers at the 2004 Summer Olympics